Lacanobia kirghisa is a moth of the Noctuoidea family. It is found in Kyrgyzstan.

Lacanobia
Moths described in 1998